Kaarel Liidak (until 1936 Karl Liidemann, 12 November 1889 Sindi – 16 January 1945 Karksi-Nuia) was an Estonian agronomist, agriculture minister and politician, member and chairman of the National Committee of the Republic of Estonia from March to August 1944.

Recognition
1936 – Honorary Member of the Estonian Agronomic Society
1938 – 3rd class Order of the White Star

References

 Aksel Mark, "Kaarel Liidak. Tema tööst ja ideoloogiast" – Eesti Agronoomide Selts Rootsis toimetis, Uppsala 1985, nr 4; ilmunud ka eraldi trükisena, eessõna Kaarel Vahtras, 40 lk, sisaldab bibliograafiat
 Kaarel Liidak, "Maaseaduse aastapäeval". Järelsõna: Jaan Lepajõe, "Kaarel Liidak eesti rahvusliku ideoloogia arendajana". Lisa: Maaseadus – Akadeemia 1989, nr 7, lk 1374–88
 Ülo Oll, "Kaarel Liidaku elukäigust" – ajakiri Agraarteadus 1990, nr 1
 Jaan Lepajõe, "Professor Kaarel Liidak eesti rahvusliku ideoloogina" – samas
 Meinhard Karelson, "Kaarel Liidak Eesti Vabariigi agraarkavast" – samas
 "Maarahva elujõud" III, Prof. Kaarel Liidak 110 [teaduskonverentsi "K. Liidak ja tänapäev" ettekanded: 12. November 1999, Tartu; mälestused / koostajad Tiit Merenäkk, Pikkar Joandi]. Elmatar, Tartu 1999, 237 lk
 Jaak Kõdar, "Muinassaar. Talunäitemäng kolmes vaatuses, proloogi ja epiloogiga" (dokumentaalne armastuslugu Nava talus 1944. aastal end varjanud Kaarel Liidaku ja taluperenaise, autori ema Lehte vahel). Steamark, Tallinn 2007, 48 lk (sisaldab lk 37–47 Kaarel Liidaku kirja Lehte Kõdarile)

External links 

1889 births
1945 deaths
Estonian agronomists
Agriculture ministers of Estonia
Academic staff of the University of Tartu
Recipients of the Order of the White Star, 3rd Class
People from Sindi, Estonia
Members of the Estonian National Assembly